Shobha Rani Tripura is a Bangladeshi Writer and teacher. She Belongs to Tripura community. She received Begum Rokeya Padak in 2017 from the Government of Bangladesh.

Biography
Shobha Rani Tripura was born on 2 February 1959 in Rangamati. 
She lived in Mahalchari Khagrachari due to her father's employment. From the childhood, she fond of writing and she started writing.
She is one of the intellectual person from her community, Tripura Race.
Apart from indigenous lifestyle, She has written short stories, poems, plays, essays, travel stories, songs, novels etc. 
Writing has become the passion for her.
In her various writings, she wrote about both hill people and plain people.
In 1966, while studying in the first year of Khagrachhari Government College, she got a job as a teacher. She used to engage in teaching

She has written numerous books on hill people. She has written short stories, novels and plays too. She was the headmistress of Choungrachharhi Government Primary School.
Shobha Rani Tripura is one of the Reang bloodline.

Shobha Rani Tripura married Mongsen Ching Monsin in 1984. He received Ekushey Padak in 2016. They had two daughters.

Shobha Rani Tripura received Begum Rokeya Padak in 2017.

Awards

Books

References

1959 births
Living people
People from Rangamati District
Recipients of Begum Rokeya Padak
Bangladeshi women writers
Bangladeshi educators
Tripuri people